The Radleys is a paranormal fantasy novel for young adults by Matt Haig, published 1 July 2010 by Canongate Books.

Reception 
The Radleys received a starred review from Publishers Weekly, as well as positive reviews from the Associated Press, The Guardian, Library Journal, Parade, Entertainment Weekly, USA Today, The New York Times, Newsday, The Dallas Morning News, and Pittsburgh Tribune-Review. In January 2011, book  landed on IndieBound's January 2011 Indie Next List and received an Alex Award from the American Library Association.

References 

Young adult novels
2010 British novels
British young adult novels
Canongate Books books